Irabotir Chupkotha  is an Indian Bengali-language television drama series which aired on Bengali GEC Star Jalsha and is available on the digital platform Hotstar. It premiered on 3 September 2018 to 2 August 2020 and was telecast daily. The show was produced by Acropoliis Entertainment Pvt. Ltd. and featured Monami Ghosh and Syed Arefin in lead roles.

Ghosh plays the lead role of "Iraboti Mitra", a 32-year-old kind and caring lady who is excellent at balancing her job and family. The series marks Ghosh's return to a lead role on Bengali television, since her portrayal of Kankon in Star Jalsha's daily soap opera Punyi Pukur.

Premise 
The story revolves around Iraboti Mitra, an independent working woman who balances her professional and personal life very well. She is 32 and unmarried as she devotes herself to nurturing her siblings well after the death of her parents. Her life takes a sudden turn when an arrogant businessman Akash Chatterjee comes in her life and threatens to take her house away, claiming the house to be his property. Later, to support her family members in times of financial crisis, she takes up the job as a P.A. to Akash, serving him with her honest efforts amid the various challenges turned tortures he inflicts upon her to satisfy his ego. Later on, Iraboti slowly discovers and brings about the emotional side of Akash, due to him having a troubled childhood, as his mother left him suddenly on his own, owing to his misery and rough temperament to develop. Amidst all this Iraboti's sister Jhelum tactfully marries Broto who was supposed to be Iraboti's fiancé. While all this is going on, Iraboti and Akash share a simultaneous love-hate relationship as they fight over the legal rights regarding the ownership of the house. Gradually, all the conflicts are settled when Iraboti marries Akash. Later on Iraboti gives birth to a daughter called Aarushi. However Aarushi gets kidnapped by Samrat lahiri and she is lost. Iraboti again gets pregnant but she is inconsolable. Later on she gives birth to a boy called Abhro.

Few years later 
Aarushi is still lost. Trisha, Tiya and Dumpo all have grown up. Later on fate brings grown up Aarushi and Iraboti together and she is brought back to her house in kolkata form Benares, where she was brought up by a foster mother. Aarushi is welcomed by all her siblings. She starts learning English. Later she goes on to win a talent hunt competition, receives many offers for playback singing and becomes popular.

Cast

Main
 Monami Ghosh as-
 Iraboti Mitra Chatterjee aka Ira, a 58-year-old retired sales executive and part time music teacher, Akash's employee and his rival regarding the ownership of her ancestral house "Shesher Kobita". She is the second among her siblings (Shato, Jhelum and Tista) and has been engaged to her childhood friend Broto. She is equally efficient at balancing her home and work and is kind and caring by nature with a strong sense of self-esteem. Akash's Wife, Arushi's Mother
 Arushi Chatterjee(24), Akash - Iraboti's Daughter, Abhishek's girlfriend
 Syed Arefin as Akash Chatterjee 
 A 64-year-old egoistic businessman and former NRI, Iraboti's boss. He claims Iraboti's ancestral house to be his. His mother left him in his childhood due to a dispute with his father and hence he thinks women to be selfish and chance-seeker opportunists from then on. From this loneliness and inner frustration of his, he presents himself as an arrogant man with no room for emotions, but however after meeting Iraboti, his life changes and he soon falls for her. Iraboti's Husband, Arushi's Father.
 Kartisha Bhattacharya as Young Arushi Chatterjee, Ira and Akash's daughter

Recurring
 Mitra family
 Suchandra Chowdhury as Mrs.Mitra known as “Thammi” 
 The Mitra family's grandmother. She is a loving and caring personality with a mind of her own. She comes across as the most sympathetic and supportive person towards Iraboti's struggles and stands up to instances of injustice towards her, especially at home. She desires peace, prosperity and unity in the family.
 Subhrajit Dutta as Shatodru Mitra aka Shato 
 Iraboti's elder brother, 61 years of age, and the eldest of the four siblings, Piyali's husband, Daampu's father, a sales man by profession. He is struggling on financial grounds and earnestly wants to support his sister Ira in her struggle.
 Nayna Banerjee as Piyali Mitra 
 Shato's wife and Iraboti's sister-in-law as well as friend. She along with Jhelum is opposing Ira's decision not to sell their ancestral house and wants to secure her and her husband Shato's financial condition by the money they can get by selling the house.
 Surabhi Mallick as Jhelum Sen (née Mitra) aka Jhili 
 Iraboti's 51-year-old younger sister and the third-born among the siblings. She is a greedy , opportunist, boastful, cunning and selfish girl, who aims to be a super model, and mostly creates problems for Ira and the family. She had a fling with Ira's fiance Broto to escape her family's financial crisis, and tactfully married Broto.
 Olivia Malakar as Tista Chatterjee (nee Mitra) aka Chhuti and Neel's wife
 Iraboti's youngest sister, 49 years of age, who is good and ss heart, and quite grounded in nature. She is a well known doctor in Philadelphia and currently she is wife of Neel Chatterjee.

 Bikash Bhowmik as Late Partha Pratim Mitra, Shatodru, Iraboti, Jhelum and Tista's father

 Pritha Ghosh / Soumi Ghosh as Trisha - Jhelum's daughter, Abhishek's girlfriend, Aarushi's cousin and bully who later became friendly
 Prarabdhi Singha as Avro - Iraboti's son, a spoilt-brat, Aarushi's brother and bully who also became friendly later
 Aishik Mukherjee (Younger) / Pritam Das as grown up Daampu- Shatodru and Piyali's Son. Elder Brother of Aarushi, Tiya's love interest.

 Chatterjee-Banerjee family
 Anuradha Roy as Late Debjani Banerjee / Debjani Chatterjee - A popular singer (specializing in Rabindra Sangeet) and a mother-figure to Iraboti. She is actually Anando Chatterjee's estranged wife and Akash's estranged mother.(Deceased)
 Sumanta Mukherjee as Late Anando Chatterjee - A retired businessman and Debjani Chatterjee's estranged husband. He is Akash's father, and the original owner of the house "Shesher Kobita".(Deceased)
 Suchismita Chowdhury as Mona Chatterjee- Neel and Sandy's mother, Rana's wife, Akash Chatterjee's governess who is staying with Chatterjee family with her two children to take care of Akash. Akash Chatterjee respects her as his 2nd mother as she took care of him in absence of his own mother.
 Judhajit Banerjee as Ranajay Chatterjee aka Rana- Anando's estranged brother, Akash's paternal uncle, Mona's husband, Neel and Sandy's father who conspired against Anando's family to exact revenge.
 Namita Chakraborty / Mithu Chakraborty as Rupa Banerjee (née Mukherjee) - Anando's younger sister and Akash's paternal aunt, Avik's mother, Meghna's mother-in-law.
Rajiv Bose as Avik Banerjee - Akash's younger cousin, who also works in his company.
 Juiee Sarkar / Madhumita Roy as Late Meghna Banerjee - Avik's wife and Iraboti and Broto's friend in college.(Deceased)
 Shayan Mukherjee as Neel Chatterjee, Sandy and Akash's brother and Tista's husband                                                                                                                        
 Priyanka Chakroborty as Sandy, Neel's sister
 Indranil Mallick as Rittik Chatterjee- Akash's brother, Jhelum's love interest
 Alokananda Guha as Tiya Banerjee-Meghna and Avik's daughter, Daampu's love interest

Others
 Raja Goswami as Subroto Sen aka Broto - Iraboti's childhood friend and ex-fiancé, who had a liking towards Jhelum and had to marry her later.
 Arnab Chowdhury as Rwitobroto Sen aka Rwito - Broto's younger brother and Chhuti's former love interest.
 Biplab Banerjee / Sanjib Sarkar as Sotyobroto Sen - Broto and Rwito's father, Iraboti's father's friend.
 Kunal Banerjee as Saptarshi - Broto's paternal cousin brother, Jhelum's ex-fiancé.
 Gopa Nandi as "Kakoli di" - A roadside vendor and Iraboti's neighbour, who considers Iraboti as a family member.
 Raj Bhattacharya as Siddhartha Choudhury aka "Sid"- A famous music director.
 Samrat Mukherjee as Samrat Lahiri - A Doctor.
 Atmadeep Ghosh as Abhishek- Aarushi and Trisha's boyfriend.

References 

2018 Indian television series debuts
2020 Indian television series endings
Star Jalsha original programming
Bengali-language television programming in India